HMS Ariel was a two funnel, 30 knot destroyer ordered by the Royal Navy under the 1895 – 1896 Naval Estimates.  Named after Shakespeare's "airy spirit", or the biblical spirit of the same name, she was the ninth ship of the name to serve in the Royal Navy. She was launched in 1897, served at Chatham and Malta, and was wrecked in a storm in 1907.

Construction
The British Admiralty ordered two "thirty-knotter" torpedo boat destroyers from John I. Thornycroft & Company as part of the 1895–96 shipbuilding programme for the Royal Navy. The two ships,  and Ariel were repeats of the four thirty-knotters ordered from Thornycroft under the previous year's programme (and ) and as such shared the same design features.

Displacement was  light and  full load, while crew was 63 officers and men. The ships were required to reach a speed of  during sea trials and carry an armament of a single QF 12 pounder 12 cwt ( calibre) gun, backed up by five 6-pounder guns, and two 18-inch (450 mm) torpedo tubes. An arched turtleback forecastle was to be fitted.

She was laid down as yard number 314 on 23 April 1896 at Thornycroft's shipyard at Chiswick on the River Thames and was launched on 5 March 1897. Ariel was completed in October 1898.

Operational history
The following year she was part of the Medway Instructional Flotilla. Lieutenant Henry Cyril Royds Brocklebank was appointed in command on 1 March 1900.

She was commissioned at Chatham on 22 August 1901 with a complement of 60 officers and men, to serve at the Mediterranean station. Upon arrival at Gibraltar she replaced  as tender to the receiving ship .  On 3 December 1901 she arrived in Malta from Gibraltar.

Loss
On 19 April 1907, Ariel was wrecked when she ran aground on a breakwater just outside Grand Harbour, Valletta, Malta, at night. All of her crew survived, and were rescued by the destroyer .

References

Citations

Bibliography
 
 
 
 
 
 
 
 
 
 
 

 

Ships built in Chiswick
1897 ships
D-class destroyers (1913)
Maritime incidents in 1907
Shipwrecks in the Mediterranean Sea
Shipwrecks of Malta
Ships built by John I. Thornycroft & Company